Raiders of the Border is a 1944 American Western film directed by John P. McCarthy and written by Adele Buffington. This is the sixth film in the "Marshal Nevada Jack McKenzie" series, and stars Johnny Mack Brown as Jack McKenzie and Raymond Hatton as his sidekick Sandy Hopkins, with Craig Woods, Ellen Hall, Ray Bennett and Edmund Cobb. The film was released on January 31, 1944, by Monogram Pictures.

Plot
There is jewel smuggling happening at the border, and US Marshals Nevada Jack McKenzie (Johnny Mack Brown) and Sandy Hopkins (Raymond Hatton) go under cover to catch the bad guys.

Cast          
Johnny Mack Brown as Nevada Jack McKenzie
Raymond Hatton as Sandy Hopkins
Craig Woods as Joe Roskins
Ellen Hall as Bonita Bayne
Ray Bennett as Tough Harsh 
Edmund Cobb as McGee
Ernie Adams as Whiskey Wiley
Richard Alexander as Steve Rollins 
Lynton Brent as Davis 
Stanley Price as Blackie
Ben Corbett as Henchman

References

External links

American Western (genre) films
1944 Western (genre) films
Monogram Pictures films
Films directed by John P. McCarthy
American black-and-white films
Films based on works by Johnston McCulley
1940s American films
1940s English-language films